The Western Open was a professional golf tournament in the United States, for most of its history an event on the PGA Tour.

The tournament's founding in 1899 actually pre-dated the start of the Tour, which is generally dated from 1916, the year the PGA of America was founded. The Western Open, organized by the Western Golf Association, was first played in September 1899 at the Glen View Club in Golf, Illinois the week preceding the U.S. Open. At the time of its final edition in 2006, it was the third-oldest active PGA Tour tournament, after The Open (1860) and U.S. Open (1895). The tournament was held a total of 103 times over the course of 108 years. The event was not held in 1900, nor in 1918 because of World War I, and not from 1943-1945 because of World War II. Golfers from the United States won the tournament 77 times, and players from Scotland won it 15 times. Walter Hagen had the most victories with five wins, and 17 other players won the event at least twice. Two amateurs also won the tournament: Chick Evans in 1910 and Scott Verplank in 1985.

Beginning in 2007, the Western Open was renamed the BMW Championship, part of the FedEx Cup playoff series, and played with the PGA Tour's point system as the sole qualification standard. It is no longer open to amateurs.

Title sponsorship was introduced in 1987, and included Beatrice, Centel, Sprint, Motorola, Advil,  and Cialis.

History
The Western Open, founded and run by the Western Golf Association, was first played in 1899 in Illinois at the Glen View Club in Golf, a northern suburb of Chicago Like the U.S. Open, in its early days it was almost exclusively won by immigrant golf professionals from the British Isles, most of whom gained full citizenship to the United States. In its early decades it was widely regarded as one of the premier golf tournaments in the USA, along with other notables of the day like the North and South Open, the PGA Championship and the Shawnee Open.

The Western Golf Association was, in some ways, and for some years, something of a rival to the United States Golf Association, especially in the midwestern and western sections of the country. 

From the event's inception through 1961, it was played at a variety of midwestern locations, as well as places such as Arizona (Phoenix), Utah (Salt Lake City) and California (San Francisco, Los Angeles). In 1923, it was held in Tennessee at the Colonial Country Club in 

Beginning in 1962, the Western Open settled within the Chicago metropolitan area and was held at a variety of courses through 1973. In 1974, it  found an annual home at the Butler National Golf Club in Oak Brook, a western suburb. It was played here through 1990, when the PGA Tour adopted a policy of holding events only at clubs which allowed minorities and women to be members. It moved in 1991 to Cog Hill Golf & Country Club in Lemont, southwest of Chicago. A 72-hole public complex, its Dubsdread Course hosted the Western Open for sixteen editions, through 2006.

In 1899, the prize fund was $150, and Willie Smith's winner's share was fifty dollars. The purse in 2006 was $5 million, with $900,000 to the final winner, Trevor Immelman.

During the second round of the 1975 tournament, Lee Trevino and Jerry Heard were struck by lightning on the 13th green of Butler National while waiting out a rain delay. Also struck at other parts of the course were Bobby Nichols, Jim Ahern, and Tony Jacklin.

BMW Championship
In 2007, the Western Open was renamed—and changed in terms of invitational criteria—to the BMW Championship, part of the four-event FedEx Cup Playoff Series. The Western Golf Association continues to run the tournament. The BMW Championship is the last FedEx Cup playoff event before The Tour Championship

Winners

References

External links
Official site of the BMW Championship
Coverage on the PGA Tour's official site

Former PGA Tour events
Golf in Illinois
Golf in Chicago
Golf in Michigan
Golf in Pennsylvania
Golf in Oregon
Golf in California
Golf in Ohio
Golf in Missouri
Golf in Iowa
Golf in New York (state)
Golf in Utah
Golf in Minnesota
Golf in Arizona
Golf in Texas
Golf in Indiana
Golf in Tennessee
Golf in Wisconsin
Sports in the Midwestern United States
Recurring sporting events established in 1899
Recurring sporting events disestablished in 2006
1899 establishments in Illinois
2006 disestablishments in Illinois